Herman Viktor Gunder Andersen (22 December 1904 – 10 August 1955) was a Danish wrestler. He competed at the 1924 and 1928 Summer Olympics.

References

1904 births
1955 deaths
Olympic wrestlers of Denmark
Wrestlers at the 1924 Summer Olympics
Wrestlers at the 1928 Summer Olympics
Danish male sport wrestlers
Sportspeople from Aarhus
20th-century Danish people